Geraldine Lee Richmond (born January 17, 1953 in Salina, Kansas) is an American chemist and physical chemist who is serving as the Under Secretary of Energy for Science in the US Department of Energy. Richmond was confirmed to her DOE role by the United States Senate on November 5, 2021. Richmond is the Presidential Chair in Science and Professor of Chemistry at the University of Oregon (UO). She conducts fundamental research to understand the chemistry and physics of complex surfaces and interfaces. These understandings are most relevant to energy production, atmospheric chemistry and remediation of the environment. Throughout her career she has worked to increase the number and success of women scientists in the U.S. and in many developing countries in Africa, Asia and South America. Richmond has served as president of the American Association for the Advancement of Science, and she received the 2013 National Medal of Science.

Education 
Richmond received her B.S. in chemistry in 1975 from Kansas State University and her Ph.D. in 1980 at University of California, Berkeley, in physical chemistry.

Career 
From 1980 to 1985 she was an assistant professor of chemistry at Bryn Mawr College. Since 1985, Richmond has been at UO, from 1985 to 1991 as an associate professor of chemistry, and as a professor since 1991. Until 1995 she was director of the Chemical Physics Institute. From 1998 to 2001 she was the Knight Professor of Liberal Arts and Sciences and between 2002 and 2013, the Richard M. and Patricia H. Noyes Professor of Chemistry at the UO. Richmond's scientific research encompasses the chemical and physical processes that occur in complex surfaces and boundary layers including the structural and thermodynamic properties of solid / liquid and liquid interfaces.  Much of her work has utilised vibrational sum-frequency spectroscopy for studying surfaces and interfaces; her review on the technique has been cited nearly 800 times since it was published.

Using these spectroscopic techniques with mixtures of H2O, D2O, and HOD, Richmond has studied the nature of hydrogen bonding surface structures and in the interfacial region.  She has also studied how these structures are perturbed by electrolytes like simple sodium halide salts or acids or bases, and by surfactants.  In examining the behavior of water at hydrophobic surfaces, Richmond found that weaker dipoles in an organic phase is more effective for orienting individual water molecules near the interface.  The interactions at aqueous / hydrophobic interfaces are important for understanding biochemical properties at boundaries such as cell membranes, as is the solvation of charge in such environments.  The study of zwitterionic species like amino acids is important for similar reasons.

In 1997 Richmond co-founded COACh along with Jeanne E. Pemberton; Richmond is currently its Director. COACh grassroots organization based at the University of Oregon that organizes international conferences and provides career building workshops aimed at increasing the number and success of women scientists in the U.S. and in many developing countries.  Over 22,000 women have attended COACh career building workshops to date.

Service 
Richmond was appointed by Governor Kitzhaber to the Oregon State Board of Higher Education from 1999 to 2003 and reappointed by Governor Kulongoski from 2004 to 2006. From 1998 to 2003 she served as Chair of the Department of Energy Basic Energy Sciences Advisory Committee (BESAC). In 2014, Richmond was elected president of the American Association for the Advancement of Science for a term beginning in February 2015. In 2014, she was appointed by Secretary John Kerry to serve as the Science Envoy for the Lower Mekong River Countries. She was appointed by President Obama to the National Science Board for a term of 2012–2016 and reappointed by President Trump from 2016 to 2022. Since 2016 she has served as Secretary of the American Academy of Arts and Sciences and is the 2019–2020 President of Sigma Xi, The Scientific Research Honor Society.

Richmond is Director of the NSF funded Research Experience for Undergraduates (REU) program at the University of Oregon.  Started in 1987 it is one of the longest running REU program in the United States. In the over 30 years of the REU program, it has hosted over 400 undergraduates from across the country with 90% continuing to graduate school.

Honors 
 1989 Coblentz Society Spectroscopy Award
 1993 Fellow, American Physical Society, "For seminal contributions to the understanding of dynamics at interfaces accomplished by innovative applications of nonlinear optical phenomena."
 1996 Francis P. Garvan-Olin Medal of the American Chemical Society
 1997 Presidential Award for Excellence in Science and Engineering Mentoring
 2001 Oregon Outstanding Scientist Award, Oregon Academy of Science
 2003 Fellow, American Association for the Advancement of Science
 2004 Spiers Medal of the UK Royal Society of Chemistry
 2006 Council on Chemical Research Diversity Award
 2006 Fellow, American Academy of Arts and Sciences
 2008 Bomem-Michaelson Award
 2008 Fellow, Association for Women in Science 
 2011 Fellow, American Chemical Society
 2011 Joel Henry Hildebrand Award of the American Chemical Society, "For pioneering applications of nonlinear optical spectroscopies and modeling of liquid surfaces and the resulting new understanding of water structure and bonding at liquid interfaces."
 2011 Member, National Academy of Sciences
 2013 Charles Lathrop Parsons Award of the American Chemical Society, "For distinguished public service to chemistry through advocacy for higher education, wise counsel and leadership in national science policy, and tireless advocacy for women chemists."
 2013 Davisson-Germer Prize for "elegant elucidation of the molecular structure and organization of liquid-liquid and liquid-air interfaces using nonlinear optical spectroscopies"
 2013 National Medal of Science for “her landmark discoveries of the molecular characteristics of water; for her creative demonstration of how her findings impact many key biological, chemical and technological processes; and for her extraordinary efforts in the United States and around the globe to promote women in science"
 2014 Pittsburgh Spectroscopy Award of the Spectroscopy Society of Pittsburgh
 2017 Honorary Doctorate Degree, Illinois Institute of Technology
 2017 Honorary Doctorate Degree, Kansas State University
 2018 Linus Pauling Award, Northwest Region American Chemical Society
 2018 Priestley Medal of the American Chemical Society
 2019 Linus Pauling Legacy Award, Oregon State University
 2020 Oregon History Maker, Oregon Historical Society
 2020 Dickson Prize, Carnegie Mellon University

References

External links 

 Prize Recipient Geraldine L. Richmond
 Richmond's Homepage
 COACh Homepage
 REU Webpage

1953 births
Living people
American physical chemists
Kansas State University alumni
National Medal of Science laureates
University of California, Berkeley alumni
University of Oregon faculty
United States Department of Energy officials
Biden administration personnel
People from Salina, Kansas
Scientists from Kansas
20th-century American chemists
20th-century American women scientists
21st-century American chemists
21st-century American women scientists
Fellows of the American Physical Society